The 1993–94 Slovenian Ice Hockey League was the third season of the Slovenian Hockey League.

At the end of the regular season the playoffs were held. Jesenice were the winners.

Teams
 Bled
 Celje
 Jesenice
 Kranjska Gora
 Maribor
 Olimpija 
 Slavija

First part of the season

Second part of season
The top four teams in part two went on to the playoffs, while the bottom three determined the final three places.

Play-offs

Semi-finals
Olimpija defeated Bled 4–0 in a best of seven series.
Olimpija – Bled 7–1 
Bled – Olimpija 5–8 
Olimpija – Bled 3–2 
Bled – Olimpija 1–4

Acroni Jesenice defeated Celje 4–1 in a best of seven series.
Celje – Jesenice 4–5 
Jesenice – Celje 3–4 
Celje – Jesenice 5–3 
Jesenice – Celje 4–3  
Celje – Jesenice 4–7

Final
Jesenice defeated Olimpija 4–3 in a best of seven series.
Olimpija – Jesenice 3–5 
Jesenice – Olimpija 2–6 
Olimpija – Jesenice 3–0 
Jesenice – Olimpija 4–6
Olimpija – Jesenice 2–5
Jesenice – Olimpija 6–2
Olimpija – Jesenice 2–3

Third place
Celje defeated Bled 4–3 in a beast of seven series

Fifth place
Triglav Kranj defeated Maribor 2–0 in a best of three series.
Triglav Kranj – Maribor 8–5
Maribor – Triglav Kranj 4–5

External links
Championnat de Slovénie 1993–94

1993–94 in Slovenian ice hockey
Slovenia
Slovenian Ice Hockey League seasons